"Surrender (Your Love)" is the second single released by English singer-songwriter Javine. The single, which features a sample of Diana Ross's "Surrender", reached number 15 on the UK Singles Chart.

Track listings
UK CD1
 "Surrender (Your Love)" – 3:07
 "Surrender (Your Love)" (Obi & Josh Remix) – 3:16

UK CD2
 "Surrender (Your Love)" – 3:07
 "Promise" – 3:37
 "Surrender (Your Love)" (Obi & Josh Remix) – 3:16
 "Surrender (Your Love)" (video & photo gallery) – 3:07

Charts

References

2003 singles
2003 songs
Innocent Records singles
Javine songs
Song recordings produced by Stargate (record producers)
Songs written by Eg White
Songs written by Nickolas Ashford
Songs written by Valerie Simpson
Virgin Records singles